Trent "Junior" Durkin (July 2, 1915 – May 4, 1935) was an American stage and film actor.

Career
Trent Bernard Durkin was born in New York City in 1915. He began his acting career in theater as a child. Durkin first appeared in films in 1930, playing the role of Huckleberry Finn in Tom Sawyer (1930)  and in Huckleberry Finn (1931), both times with Jackie Coogan playing Tom Sawyer. Under contract to RKO Radio Pictures, he was cast in a series of "B" films in comedy roles that capitalized on his gangly appearance.  He co-starred in Hell's House (1932) with then newcomer Bette Davis.

RKO began grooming him for more adult roles. In his final film, Chasing Yesterday (1935) starring Anne Shirley, he was billed as Trent Durkin.

Death
In 1935, Durkin was returning from a hunting trip in Mexico with Jackie Coogan and three others, including Coogan's father, Charles Jones (manager of the Coogan Ranch) and writer Robert Horner. Coogan's father had to swerve to avoid colliding with a car coming straight at him, and his car left the road, rolling repeatedly until it landed in a creek bed. The accident occurred about 50 miles (80 km) from San Diego, California. Jackie Coogan was the only survivor.

At the time, Durkin was living with agent Henry Willson, and they were rumored to be lovers. In a 2013 interview, former child star Diana Serra Cary (known as Baby Peggy), a close friend of Durkin, said, "It would not surprise me to know that Trent was gay. However, in the early thirties it would have been suicidal for such a promising young actor to come out of the closet. Especially without the protection of a strong producer, or already under contract to MGM, with studio head Louis B. Mayer seriously invested in his future success as a leading man."

Durkin was interred in the Forest Lawn Memorial Park Cemetery in Glendale, California.

Filmography

References

External links

 Down the road less traveled..: Trent Bernard Junior Durkin

Male actors from New York City
American male child actors
American male film actors
American male stage actors
Burials at Forest Lawn Memorial Park (Glendale)
Road incident deaths in California
1915 births
1935 deaths
20th-century American male actors